Paintless dent repair (PDR), also known as paintless dent removal, describes a method of removing minor dents from the body of a motor vehicle. A wide range of damage can be repaired using paintless dent repair as long as the paint surface is intact. Paintless dent repair may be used on both aluminum and steel panels.

The most common practical use for paintless dent repair  is the repair of hail damage, door dings, minor creases, large dents and bodylines damage.

The method can also be utilized to prepare a damaged panel for repainting by minimizing the use of body filler. This technique is currently known as "push to paint" or "push to prep".

Limiting factors for a successful repair using paintless dent repair include the flexibility of the paint (most of today's refined automotive paint finishes allow for successful PDR) and the extent to which the metal has been stretched by the damage, which depends on the thickness of the metal, the curvature or flatness where the damage occurred and the intensity of the impact. Generally speaking, the shallower the dent, the greater the likelihood of paintless dent repair being a suitable option. Even dents several inches in diameter can be repaired by this method as long as the metal and paint are not stretched. It is possible to repair a shallow large dent or crease to an acceptable level, but very sharp dents and creases may not be suitable for paintless dent repair.

History
Although paintless dent repair recalls repoussé and chasing, which date back to the 3rd century BC, paintless dent removal was started by Frank T. Sargent in 1931, when he wrote a groundbreaking work "The Key To Metal Bumping". This book describes the tools of paintless dent repair, how to use them, and even gives illustrations on how one might predict the metal to move. 

Almost 30 years later Oskar Flaig made the first public display on record, in February 1960 during the "International Motor Sports Show" in New York City, USA.

Oskar Flaig was an ordinary member of staff at Mercedes-Benz. His job was to take care of the paintwork of all the show cars presented at trade fairs. Damage, scratches on the paintwork and small dents, produced by the public during the day, needed to be re-painted at night, so the vehicles would be in perfect condition the next day. At the trade fair in New York City, Oskar Flaig used a hammer handle to push out a small dent, so he would need to apply less filler before painting. Nevertheless, the result already looked perfect after pushing. After the show, Flaig returned home to Germany and started developing techniques and tools to repair dents. He was eventually promoted to foreman at the Mercedes Sindelfingen plant where he was known as the “golden tinsmith” and started PDR training programs at all branch plants. These techniques were used in Germany for a long time before finally being promoted as a successful way to repair dents in the United States in 1979-1983 when Juergen Holzer moved from Germany to Minneapolis, Minnesota and started Dent Kraft (the first recorded business in the United States use paintless dent repair).

In other forms of metal working, similar techniques of paintless dent removal, may have been employed as early as the 1930s in automotive assembly plants, and was popularized much later.

Techniques

The most common PDR techniques utilize metal rods and body picks to push out the dents from the underside of the body panel. Glue and specially designed tabs may be used to pull out the dents from the outside of the panel. Fine tuning the repair often involves tapping down the repair to remove small high spots. Technicians can blend high spots to match the texture of the paint called orange peel. Cracking or chipping can be avoided with the use of heat, although a re-painted surface has a greater likelihood of cracking.

References

See also

New York International Auto Show

Motor vehicle maintenance